Martin Seamus "Marty" McFly is a fictional character and the protagonist of the Back to the Future franchise. He is portrayed by Canadian actor Michael J. Fox in all three films. McFly also appears in the animated series, where he was voiced by David Kaufman. In the video game developed and published by Telltale Games, he is voiced by A. J. Locascio; in addition, Fox voiced McFly's future counterparts at the end of the game. In the stage musical adaptation, he was played by Olly Dobson in the original West End production and will be played by Casey Likes in the upcoming Broadway production.  In 2019, McFly was selected by Empire magazine as the 12th Greatest Movie Character of All Time.

Biography
Marty McFly is the Back to the Future protagonist who was born in Hill Valley, California to the McFlys, a family of Irish descent. Little is known about the character's life prior to the first Back to the Future film, except for the fact that he set fire to the living-room rug when he was 8 years old (in a statement of Marty's to his future parents). Despite never explicitly being explained in the film, Bob Zemeckis confirmed that Marty met his friend Dr. Emmett "Doc" Brown when he was around 14 after hearing that Brown was a dangerous lunatic. Marty, being the “red-blooded American teenager” he was, wanted to go and see what it was all about for himself. He snuck into Doc's lab and was fascinated by all his inventions. When Doc caught him, he was glad to have someone interested in his work and their friendship began.

In the first film, in 1985, Marty plays guitar with his group The Pinheads and likes listening to Huey Lewis and the News, Tom Petty and the Heartbreakers, Van Halen, and Michael Jackson. He is also a talented skateboarder and proves to be an excellent pistol shot, a skill he has honed by playing shooting games such as Wild Gunman at his local 7-Eleven.

In an alternate timeline shown in Back to the Future Part II, by 2015, Marty's life has spiraled out of control due to a hand injury that left him unable to play the guitar. This injury occurs in 1985 after Marty accepts school nemesis Douglas J. Needles' challenge to a road race after being labelled a chicken, and crashes into a Rolls-Royce. In 1885, Biff Tannen's great-grandfather, Buford, goads Marty into a showdown, which Marty wins despite refusing to draw a gun against Buford. Once he returns to 1985, he remembers both this event and his great-great-grandfather Seamus McFly's advice and drops out of Needles' challenge, avoiding the collision that would have ruined his prospects for success as a guitarist.

Movie events and time travel

In the first film, Back to the Future, Dr. Brown shows Marty the time machine, in the form of a DeLorean, which he had invented after stealing plutonium (used as fuel for the vehicle's time circuits) from Libyan terrorists, who wanted him to build a nuclear weapon. During this exchange, the doctor is shot by the enraged terrorists, and Marty escapes from them in the time machine, accidentally traveling back to 1955. There, he encounters his teenage parents and disrupts the course of their meeting. He contacts the 1955 Dr. Brown and with his help, reunites his parents, and travels back to an alternate 1985, where his father George is a novelist, and Biff, his father's high school bully, becomes their caretaker. He also finds out that Dr. Brown is still alive and that he had worn a bulletproof vest after Marty had warned him about his fate in 1955.

In the second film, Back to the Future Part II, Dr. Brown brings Marty and Jennifer to 2015. They had married and their teenage son, Marty Jr, was arrested, costing the whole McFly family. Jennifer is knocked unconscious by Brown and Marty (from 1985) who disguises himself as his son and comes into contact with the elder Biff. His son was supposed to meet Biff's grandson, Griff, who forces him to commit a crime with Griff and his gang. The disguised Marty prevents this from happening and gets into a hoverboard dash. This results in Griff and his gang getting arrested, instead of Marty Jr. Jennifer, who was left behind, is taken back to her 2015 home by the police after tracing her back using her fingerprints. Marty and Dr. Brown rescue her while unbeknownst to them, Elder Biff steals their time machine and returns to 1955, where he gives his younger self an Almanac from the future to use for gambling. When all of them return to 1985, they discover that Hill Valley had become a dystopia, with Biff becoming one of the richest and most corrupt men in the country. He had forcefully married Marty's mother, Lorraine, and secretly murdered Marty's father. He also legalized gambling in the process of becoming known as the 'Luckiest Man on Earth'. Marty and Dr. Brown return to 1955 again to steal the Almanac from 1955 Biff, in which they succeed. Dr. Brown, however, is sent to 1885 after lightning strikes the DeLorean. Marty receives a letter from Brown, written on September 2, 1885.

In the third film, Back to the Future Part III, Marty re-contacts 1955 Dr. Brown and informs him of everything that has happened. Together they discover that the doctor was killed six days after writing the letter, and that he had hidden the DeLorean in a cave. Marty goes back to 1885 and meets his great-great-grandparents, Seamus and Maggie, and their son, his great-grandfather. He searches for Dr. Brown and finds out that he has become a blacksmith. Marty crosses paths with "Mad Dog" Tannen, Biff's great-grandfather, and gets into a brawl with him. While they plan their escape, Marty and Dr. Brown meet Clara Clayton, a teacher, and the doctor falls in love with her. During the festival, "Mad Dog" and Marty agree on a one-on-one showdown the next day. However, that is the day Marty is meant to go back to 1985. The morning later Marty defeats "Mad Dog" and he and the doctor proceed with their plans. In the end, Dr. Brown decides to stay in 1885 with Clara, while Marty goes back to 1985. The time machine is destroyed by an oncoming train, with Marty barely escaping. He reunites with Jennifer and decides not to race Needles, which would have cost him his music career.

Family
In the Back to the Future film franchise, Marty McFly is the youngest of three children of George McFly and Lorraine Baines-McFly. He has a brother, Dave McFly, and a sister, Linda McFly. In addition, he has uncles Milton, Toby, and Joey, and aunts Sally and Ellen (Ellen was born in 1956, so wasn't in the first movie). Joey serves a prison sentence in 1985 and has been denied parole again. In the first movie, Lorraine is 17 (nearly 18), Milton is 12, Sally is 6, Toby is 4, and Joey is 1. Ellen was born a year later.

Marty's secondary entourage consists of girlfriend Jennifer Parker and best friend Emmett Brown, a scientist whom Marty and Jennifer call "Doc." There is an implication that Marty is ashamed of his family and does not spend much time at home, preferring to hang out with Doc, Jennifer, or the guys in his band, The Pinheads. However, Marty's relationships with his family changes after he returns from 1955, with him no longer being alienated by his parents and his father working as a local college professor and a successful novelist in the alternate timeline he inadvertently created. Marty also meets his great-great paternal grandparents Seamus and Maggie, when he is stranded in 1885. He also meets their infant son William, Marty's great-grandfather. Through his interaction with Seamus and Maggie, Marty discovers that Seamus had a brother named Martin, thus Marty's great-great-granduncle, who was killed after being goaded into a fight in Virginia City, Nevada.

By 2015, Marty has married his girlfriend Jennifer and has two children, Martin "Marty" Jr. and Marlene.

Aliases
Marty has had many aliases throughout the Back to the Future series, usually as a result of meeting his relatives in the past, such as Lorraine mistakenly thinking his name is "Calvin Klein", due to it being Marty's brand of underwear. In the first film, Marty uses the alias "Darth Vader, an extraterrestrial from the Planet Vulcan" while wearing a radiation suit in an attempt to coerce George into asking Lorraine out to the dance. In Part III, Marty uses the name "Clint Eastwood" when asked by Maggie McFly and later by Buford Tannen. In Back to the Future: The Game, he uses one of three aliases; "Sonny Crockett", "Harry Callahan", or "Michael Corleone".

Other appearances
 The role of Marty in Back to the Future: The Musical was debuted by stage actor, Olly Dobson. In the London production, the character has since been played by Will Haswell, Glen Facey and Ben Joyce. He will be played by Casey Likes in the upcoming Broadway production of the musical.
 Marty is voiced by David Kaufman in Back to the Future: The Animated Series.
 Marty makes a cameo in the Lego Jurassic World video game.
 Fox reprises his role in the crossover toys-to-life Lego video game Lego Dimensions.
 Doc Brown and Marty appeared on Jimmy Kimmel Live! on the October 21, 2015 show, set on the day that the characters traveled to in Part II.
 There is a cinema scene in Season 3 of Stranger Things where a section of Back to the Future is shown with Marty and Doc Brown.

Influence
Morty Smith of the American animated series Rick and Morty (voiced by Justin Roiland) began as a parody of Marty McFly.

Japanese pro wrestler Kushida dresses as Marty McFly as part of his ring character.

References

External links
 
 Marty McFly on IMDb

Michael J. Fox
Back to the Future (franchise)
Fictional characters from California
Film characters introduced in 1985
Fictional guitarists
Fictional rock musicians
Fictional Irish American people
Fictional skateboarders
Science fiction film characters
Teenage characters in film
Time travelers